Virginia Woolf was an English writer.

Woolf may also refer to:
 Woolf (surname)
 Woolf (given name)
 Woolf College, Kent, the newest college of the University of Kent
 The Woolf Institute, an academic institute in Cambridge, England, dedicated to the study of interfaith relations between Jews, Christians and Muslims